Samuel Hambleton (January 8, 1812 – December 9, 1886) was a U.S. Representative from Maryland from 1869 to 1873.

Early life 
Samuel Hambleton was born at "Waterloo" farm in Talbot County, Maryland. He was educated by private tutors and attended Easton Academy. He studied law, was admitted to the bar in 1833, and commenced practice in Easton, Maryland.

Personal life
Hambleton was married and had a son and a daughter.

His contemporaries referred to him as Colonel Hambleton.

Career 
He served as a member of the Maryland House of Delegates in 1834 and 1835, and was State's attorney for Talbot County from 1836 to 1844.

Hambleton served in the Maryland State Senate from 1844 to 1850, was president of the Chesapeake & Ohio Canal in 1853 and 1854, and again served as a member of the House of Delegates in 1853. He was elected as a Democrat to the Forty-first and Forty-second Congresses, and served from March 4, 1869, to March 3, 1873.

Hambleton served as a director and attorney for the Easton National Bank.

Death
Hambleton died at his home in Easton on December 9, 1886. He is interred in Spring Hill Cemetery.

References

1812 births
1886 deaths
People from Easton, Maryland
People from Talbot County, Maryland
Democratic Party members of the Maryland House of Delegates
Democratic Party Maryland state senators
Democratic Party members of the United States House of Representatives from Maryland
19th-century American politicians